John of Ravenna ( [or da] Ravenna) may refer to:

Giovanni Conversini (1343–1408), Italian humanist
Giovanni Malpaghini (1346–1417), Italian humanist

John I, bishop of Ravenna (c. 477–494)
John II, archbishop of Ravenna (578–595)
John III, archbishop of Ravenna (607–625)
John IV, archbishop of Ravenna (625–c. 631)
John V, archbishop of Ravenna (c. 726–c. 744)
John VI, archbishop of Ravenna (c. 777–c. 784)
John VII, archbishop of Ravenna (c. 850–878)
John VIII, archbishop of Ravenna (898–904)
John IX, archbishop (905–914), later Pope John X
John X, archbishop of Ravenna (983–998)
John XI, archbishop of Ravenna (1051–1072)
Giovanni Migliorati (cardinal), archbishop of Ravenna as John XII (1400–1405)